Viviennea superba is a moth in the family Erebidae first described by Herbert Druce in 1883. It is found in Colombia, Ecuador and French Guiana.

References

Phaegopterina
Moths described in 1883